Michael Patrick Mulroy is the former United States Deputy Assistant Secretary of Defense (DASD) for the Middle East, serving under Secretary James N. Mattis and Secretary Mark T. Esper. He was responsible for representing the United States Department of Defense (DoD) for defense policy and for Middle East policy in the interagency. He is also a retired CIA Paramilitary Operations Officer and a United States Marine.

After leaving the Pentagon, he co-founded the Lobo Institute along with U.S. Navy SEAL Eric Oehlerich. He also began serving on the board of the nonprofit Grassroots Reconciliation Group, became a Special Advisor to the United Nations,  the Co-director of the Yemen Steering Initiative, a Senior Fellow for national security and defense policy with the Middle East Institute, and an ABC News National Security Analyst, and the co-president of End Child Soldiering.

Mulroy’s post-service efforts focus on educating people on global conflicts, combatting extremism, and the philosophy of stoicism.

Career

Military service 
Mulroy is a retired U.S. Marine and served as a commissioned officer and an enlisted Marine on active duty and in the reserves. He served as an Armored Crewman (United States military occupation code (MOS) 1811) of a M1 Abrams tank, a Judge Advocate (MOS 4412) and an Infantry Officer (MOS 0302). His military awards include the Joint Service Commendation Medal, the Navy and Marine Corps Commendation Medal, the Afghanistan Campaign Medal, the Iraq Campaign Medal, the Global War on Terrorism Expeditionary Medal, among others.

Mulroy was against the decision to pull all U.S. military forces out of Afghanistan. He explained that the U.S. should have kept a residual force that could have preserved everything that the coalition and Afghan partners had fought for the last 20 years.

CIA service 
Mulroy is a retired Paramilitary Operations Office (PMOO) from the Special Activities Center (formerly named Special Activities Division) of the CIA. PMOOs are a hybrid of a clandestine intelligence officer and a military special operator, belonging to the Special Operations Group (SOG) within SAC. They are recruited primarily from the United States Special Operations Command.

Mulroy joined the CIA in 2015. While at the CIA, Mulroy spent most of career in conflict areas. His positions included service as a Chief of a Department in Special Activities Center (SAC), a Chief of Station, a Chief of an Expeditionary Team, a Chief of Base, a Deputy Chief of a Branch in Special Activities Division (SAD) and a PMOO in a Branch in SAD, among others.

Deputy Assistant Secretary of Defense (DASD) service 

Mulroy was DASD from October 20, 2017 to December 1, 2019. The DASD for the Middle East is a member of the Senior Executive Service in the Secretary of Defense's office. Mulroy was responsible for DoD policy and for representing the DoD in the interagency for the countries of Bahrain, Egypt, Israel, Iran, Iraq, Jordan, Kuwait, Lebanon, Oman, Palestine, Qatar, Saudi Arabia, Syria, United Arab Emirates and Yemen. As DASD for the Middle East, Mulroy was responsible for implementing the National Defense Strategy of 2018 in that region and the Irregular Warfare Annex (IWA) to that strategy.

At a workshop at RAND Corporation in October 2019, Mulroy officially rolled out the IWA, saying it was a critical component of the 2018 NDS. He noted that irregular warfare (IW) included counter-insurgency (COIN), counter-terrorism (CT), unconventional warfare (UW), foreign internal defense (FID), sabotage and subversion, stabilization (warfare), and information operations (IO). He continued that IW had been perceived as limited to the CT effort used to fight violent extremist organizations but should be applied to all competition areas, including the great powers of China and Russia and the rogue states of North Korea and Iran. Mulroy said that the U.S. must be prepared to respond with "aggressive, dynamic, and unorthodox approaches to IW" to be competitive across these priorities.

In late  2020, during the delay in the transition between the Trump Administration to the Biden Administration, the incoming team for the DoD reached out to several former members of then-Secretary James Mattis for assistance. Mulroy was one of the former officials and one of the few that agreed to assist.

Advocacy for child soldiers

My Star in the Sky 
Mulroy is a co-maker along with U.S. Navy SEAL Eric Oehlerich, of the documentary film, My Star in the Sky, which in the Acholi dialect of Uganda and South Sudan is “Lakalatwe.” The film portrays the relationship between two former child soldiers in the Lord's Resistance Army led by Joseph Kony, who rebelled against the government of Uganda for decades. Mulroy's goal in making the film was to draw attention to the ongoing abuse of child soldiers in many countries. Foreign Policy reports that the documentary came about after Mulroy and Oehlerich met a family of former child soldiers during Operation Observant Compass (OOC).  Mulroy called OOC a “model” for how to address child soldiers using influence operations instead of lethal force and working with Non-Government Organizations (NGOs)s who found mothers of child soldiers and had them broadcast messages over the radio to come home. Mulroy said that he hopes that OOC serves as a model for future programs to address child soldiers, as well as other operations, as it showed how the U.S. military could use “soft power, influence operations” and other aspects of so-called “irregular warfare” to fight the problem.

This documentary has been screened at Yale University's Jackson Institute for Global Affairs, the Atlantic Council, a Washington, D.C. based think tank for international affairs, the Enough Project, a non-profit group to end crimes against humanity, Georgetown University's Institute for the Study of Diplomacy, and the Truman National Security Project.

In an interview for the podcast Frog Logic, a podcast primarily for the special operations community, Mulroy said, "I don’t think anyone became a Marine, or a SEAL, or a [CIA] paramilitary officer with the idea that they were going to fight a child.”

Grassroots Reconciliation Group 
Mulroy is on the Board of Directors for the Grassroots Reconciliation Group (GRG). GRG was initiated as part of a United States Agency for International Development (USAID)-funded program called the Northern Uganda Peace Initiative (NUPI) to reconcile and rehabilitate former child soldiers of Joseph Kony's Lord's Resistance Army.

Philosophy 
Mulroy is a proponent of Stoic philosophy. In an essay in modern Stoicism entitled, “A Case for the Philosopher King,” Mulroy advocated for a return of teaching virtue ethics in school and modeling examples of those that should be emulated like Marcus Aurelius, James Stockdale, John Lewis, among others. He did this after citing the precipitous decline in the confidence Americans have in one another.

In an article for ABC News essay entitled, “Where philosophy intersects with war training: stoic soldiers,” Mulroy and Donald Robertson advocated for using stoicism as a philosophy in the military because of its focus on wisdom, justice, temperance, and courage. He advocated for the U.S. military to incorporate stoicism into its basic training at a conference hosted by the U.S. Army National Guard in January 2021 and in a conference hosted by Modern Stoicism as one of the keynote speakers, along with retired National Security Advisor H.R. McMaster and Georgetown University Professor Nancy Sherman.

References

External links
 
 Lobo Institute

United States Department of Defense officials
Living people
People of the Central Intelligence Agency
Trump administration personnel
Counterinsurgency theorists
Counterterrorism theorists
Guerrilla warfare theorists
United States Marine Corps officers
Augusta University alumni
Year of birth missing (living people)
Recipients of the Intelligence Star
American documentary film directors
American people of Irish descent
Documentary war filmmakers